Jenn Monroe (born 1970 in Wellsville, NY) is an American poet and editor.

Monroe has taught at the college level since 1999, spending seven years at Chester College of New England before it closed in May 2012.

Monroe is the co-founder and executive producer of the literary blog Extract(s): Daily Dose of Lit, and co-founder and executive editor of Eastern Point Press.  Her poem "Gilan Province" was nominated for a Pushcart Prize in 2012 by Radius Lit.

Publications 
Something More Like Love, poetry (Finishing Line Press, 2012)

Poems have appeared in
 MiPOesias (Winter 2013)
 Radius: Poetry From the Center to the Edge (Fall 2012)
 The Rusty Nail (Fall 2012)
 The Bookends Review (Fall 2012)
 burntdistrict (Fall 2012)
 20/Twenty Journal (Fall 2012)
 Contemporary American Voices (Featured poet, September 2012)
 Tygerburning Literary Journal (Summer 2012)
 Jet Fuel Review (Spring 2012)
 Petrichor Machine (Spring 2012)
 The Lindenwood Review (June 2011)
 Danse Macabre (March 2011)
 Caper Literary Journal (Winter 2011)
 The Chamber 4 Literary Magazine (Winter 2011)
 Sakura Review (Winter 2011)
 Shaking Like a Mountain (August, 2010)
 Permafrost (Summer 2010)
 Magnapoets (Summer 2010)
 Big Lucks (Summer 2010)
 OVS Magazine (Fall 2009 & Summer 2010)
 Third Wednesday (Fall 2009)
 Off the Coast (Fall 2009)
 Sunsets & Silencers (2009)
 Naugatuck River Review (2009)
 Bent Pin Quarterly (2008 & 2009)
 I Will Bear This Scar: Poems of Childless Women'' (2005)

References

1970 births
Living people
21st-century American poets
American women poets
21st-century American women writers